Magna Hungaria, literally "Great Hungary" or "Ancient Hungary", refers to the ancestral home of the Hungarians.

Magna Hungaria was mentioned by the thirteenth-century Franciscan Giovanni da Plano Carpini in his reports of his travels in northern and central Asia. Friar Julian also visited Magna Hungaria in the interest of finding the Eastern Hungarians.

According to the most common version, Magna Hungaria was in the forest-steppe regions of Bashkortostan, in the area of the Kushnarenkovo and Karayakupovo cultures, in the region of the Southern Urals.

Literature
 Аннинский С. А. Известия венгерских миссионеров XIII-XIV вв. о татарах и восточной Европе // Исторический архив. — 1940. — No. 3. — С. 71–76.
 Иванов В.А. Путями степных кочевий. Уфа, Башкнижиздат, 1984, С. 38-58.

01
01
Nomadic groups in Eurasia
History of Ural